Heritage: The Young Concubine (歲月河山：我家的女人) is a 1980 Hong Kong TV drama by RTHK starring Leslie Cheung. It was directed by David King, Wong Chi and Wong King Keung. Written by Lilian Lee. Runtime: 92 minutes.

Synopsis 
The story takes place in the New Territories in the 1920s. Leslie Cheung is a student who returns to his home village and becomes embroiled in a love affair with his father's concubine.

Cast
 Leslie Cheung
 Hon Kong
 Hui Ying Ying
 Law Kar Ying
 Law Keung
 Lee Pang Fei
 Lo Hung

Awards
 16th Chicago International Film Festival
 First Commonwealth Film and Television Festival

References

External links 
 Entry at lesliecheung.cc (archive)
 Streaming media file at RTHK website 
 hkcinemagic entry

RTHK original programming
1980 television films
1980 films
Fiction set in the 1920s